Richthofen Castle is a historic 35-room mansion in the neighborhood of Montclair in the City and County of Denver, Colorado, United States. Completed in 1887, it was originally designed by Alexander Cazin for Baron Walter von Richthofen, a German immigrant and member of the prominent Richthofen aristocratic family. Additions and remodels on the house were later made by Maurice Biscoe and Henry Hewitt in 1910 and Jules Jaques Benedict in 1924. The mansion was listed on the National Register of Historic Places in 1975.

References

External links

Castles in Colorado
National Register of Historic Places in Denver
Houses completed in 1887
1887 establishments in Colorado
Gilded Age mansions
Gothic Revival architecture in Colorado
Tudor Revival architecture in Colorado